Joshua Aaron Anderson (born August 10, 1982) is an American retired Major League Baseball (MLB) outfielder.  He played college baseball at Eastern Kentucky University and was drafted in the 4th round of the 2003 Major League Baseball Draft by the Houston Astros.

In 2004, he led the minor leagues in stolen bases with 79.

After playing much of the 2007 with the Triple-A Round Rock Express, Anderson made his MLB debut on September 2, 2007.

On November 16, 2007, he was traded from the Houston Astros to the Atlanta Braves for relief pitcher Óscar Villarreal. He had a short stint with the Braves in 2008 from May 30–June 10 before returning to the minors. He was recalled to the Braves on August 27, 2008, after the Braves traded starting center fielder Mark Kotsay to the Boston Red Sox.

On March 30, 2009, Anderson was traded to the Detroit Tigers for minor league pitcher Rudy Darrow. On July 24, 2009, he was designated for assignment by the Tigers.

On July 30, 2009, Anderson was traded to the Kansas City Royals for cash considerations. On December 12, 2009, Anderson was non-tendered by the Royals and became a free agent.

On January 5, 2010, Anderson signed a minor league contract with the Cincinnati Reds with an invite to spring training. On May 11, 2010, Anderson was released by the Cincinnati Reds. He signed a minor league contract with the Milwaukee Brewers two days later. Anderson was released by the Brewers on June 11, 2010.

On June 15, Anderson signed a minor league deal to return to the Atlanta Braves.  He was assigned to the club's Triple-A affiliate, the Gwinnett Braves. On July 15 Anderson was moved to the disabled list with a fractured hand. On August 4, 2010, Anderson was released by the Atlanta Braves.

Anderson, now a sales rep for Gatormade Trailers, resides in Eubank, KY with his wife Heather and their two children. Heather is the author of Strangely Dim: Discovering God’s Light When Your Commitment to Him Leaves You in the Dark.

References

External links

Baseball players from Kentucky
Major League Baseball outfielders
Tri-City ValleyCats players
Lexington Legends players
Salem Avalanche players
Corpus Christi Hooks players
Round Rock Express players
Houston Astros players
Richmond Braves players
Atlanta Braves players
Detroit Tigers players
Kansas City Royals players
Nashville Sounds players
Louisville Bats players
Gwinnett Braves players
People from Somerset, Kentucky
1982 births
Living people
Eastern Kentucky Colonels baseball players